Matheus Aleksander dos Anjos (born 21 December 1998), known as Matheus Anjos, is a Brazilian professional soccer player who plays as a midfielder for Ponte Preta, on loan from Athletico Paranaense.

Honours
Athletico Paranaense
Campeonato Paranaense: 2018, 2019

References

External links

1998 births
Living people
Sportspeople from Campinas
Brazilian footballers
Association football midfielders
Campeonato Brasileiro Série A players
Campeonato Brasileiro Série B players
Club Athletico Paranaense players
Guarani FC players
Paraná Clube players
Botafogo Futebol Clube (SP) players
Associação Atlética Ponte Preta players